Ruslan Pidhornyy (born 25 July 1977) is a Ukrainian former professional road bicycle racer. He was born in Vinnytsia.

In 2004, Pidhornyy, along with Juriy Ivanov, was released from  due to his involvement in an investigation of assaulting and robbing a prostitute.

In 2008, he was the Ukrainian Road Race champion.

Major results 

1997
 2nd Time trial, National Road Championships
1999
 3rd Road race, National Road Championships
2000
 9th Overall Giro Ciclistico d'Italia
2001
 1st Overall Giro del Friuli Venezia Giulia
 1st La Popolarissima
2002
 2nd Road race, National Road Championships
2003
 1st Overall Giro del Friuli Venezia Giulia
1st Stage 1 (TTT)
 2nd Coppa Colli Briantei
 3rd Circuito del Porto
 3rd Gran Premio Inda
2004
 1st Giro del Medio Brenta
 1st Giro del Casentino
 1st Gran Premio Industria del Cuoio e delle Pelli
 2nd Trofeo Internazionale Bastianelli
 2nd Freccia dei Vini
 2nd Gara Ciclistica Montappone
 3rd Cronoscalata Internazionale Gardone
 4th Overall Giro del Friuli Venezia Giulia
 9th GP Industria Artigianato e Commercio Carnaghese
2005
 2nd GP Nobili Rubinetterie
 5th GP Industria & Artigianato di Larciano
 8th Overall Brixia Tour
 10th Overall Bayern–Rundfahrt
2006
 1st Trofeo Matteotti
 2nd Overall Tour of Austria
 2nd GP Città di Camaiore
 3rd Overall Brixia Tour
 3rd GP Nobili Rubinetterie
 3rd Memorial Marco Pantani
 10th GP Fred Mengoni
2007
 2nd Road race, National Road Championships
 3rd Giro dell'Appennino
 4th Overall Brixia Tour
1st Stage 3
 5th Overall Tour of Austria
 6th Giro del Lazio
 7th GP Industria Artigianato e Commercio Carnaghese
 9th Trofeo Melinda
2008
 1st  Road race, National Road Championships
 3rd Overall Tour of Austria
1st Stage 3
 3rd Memorial Marco Pantani
 6th Overall Circuit de Lorraine
 8th Trofeo Matteotti
 10th Overall Brixia Tour
 10th Overall Tour de Slovénie
2009
 2nd Overall Tour of Austria
 3rd Road race, National Road Championships
2010
 1st Stage 3 Tour of Austria
 National Road Championships
2nd Road race
4th Time trial
 8th Overall Brixia Tour
1st Stage 1 (TTT)

References

External links 

Palmares at Trap Friis
Palmares on CyclingBase (French)

Cyclists at the 2008 Summer Olympics
Olympic cyclists of Ukraine
Ukrainian male cyclists
1977 births
Living people
Sportspeople from Vinnytsia